The Devon and Cornwall Rail Partnership is the largest Community Rail Partnership in the United Kingdom.  It was formed in 1991 to promote the use of, and improvements to, rural railways in Devon and Cornwall, and also to promote the places served in order to improve the local economy.

The Partnership is based at the University of Plymouth and is backed by Devon County Council, Cornwall Council, and Plymouth City Council.  Railway industry backing came initially from Wessex Trains but it withdrew in 2006 when its franchise was transferred to Great Western Railway, which had joined the Partnership the previous year. Today the Partnership is backed by Great Western Railway, CrossCountry and South Western Railway as well as the local councils.

Routes

There are nine branch lines promoted by the Partnership, each supported by local councils with local forums made up of representatives from the local community. 
 Atlantic Coast Line – Par to Newquay
 Looe Valley Line – Liskeard to Looe
 Maritime Line – Truro to Falmouth
 St Ives Bay Line – St Erth to St Ives
 Tamar Valley Line – Plymouth to Gunnislake
 Tarka Line – Exeter St Davids to Barnstaple
 Avocet Line Exeter Central to Exmouth
 Riviera Line Exeter Central to Paignton
 East Devon Line – Exeter St Davids to Axminster 

In addition, several railway stations have "Friends" groups supported by the Partnership and which undertake local promotion of services and take on work such as gardening and litter collection.

Investment
The Partnership has secured additional investment to improve services] on the branch lines over the years. 

The additional services thus funded have included:
 Sunday services on the Tamar Valley Line and the Maritime Line throughout the year, whereas previously they had run just in the peak summer
 Summer Sunday services on the Atlantic Coast and Looe Valley lines
 Extra trains on the Atlantic Coast and Tarka lines.
 Additional weekday trains on the Atlantic Coast Line in 2004 - Newquay’s best train service for many years.
 Station improvements on the Atlantic Coast, Looe Valley, Tamar Valley, and Tarka lines, and also a summertime ticket office at Looe station.

All in all, the investment and promotion has seen passenger numbers on all of the branch lines (excluding the East Devon Line) double since 2001.

Promotion
A variety of promotional methods are employed, ranging from station or line timetables and scenic line guides, through to more specialised promotions.

Walking
The Partnership has produced two free booklets which detail walks from stations on the branch lines, in both counties. Walks are either circular or linear and are also downloadable from the Partnership's website.

Rail Ale Trails
Starting with the Tarka Line in 2002, a rail ale trail has been established along each of the six lines in association with CAMRA.  By collecting stamps from the participating pubs in a special leaflet, drinkers can claim tour t-shirts in return for a completed sheet of stamps and production of their train tickets.

Birdwatching
There are many opportunities for spotting wild birds on both the Looe Valley Line and St Ives Bay Line. The Partnership has worked with the RSPB to produce leaflets and a video highlighting this. 

Foodie Guides

The Partnership has produced 'foodie guides' for the Looe Valley Line, Maritime, Tarka and Avocet Lines. The guides detail cafes, restaurants, local markets and food events that people can get to by train. Businesses were chosen based on their use of local produce and championing of local suppliers.

Ticketing
A key part of the promotion of all the lines is the range of tickets available.  Building on the success of established railway tickets such as Off-Peak Returns and Rover tickets, and the Devon and Cornwall Railcard (which offers discounts to local residents), further savings have been offered through Group Save tickets and Carnets (books of 10 tickets sold at a discount).

Trains
A number of Wessex Trains DMUs were given special liveries to promote the lines in the Partnership. They worked not just in Devon and Cornwall but further afield too and so could be seen at places such as Southampton, Cardiff Central, and Bristol Temple Meads railway stations.  Most continued to work for Great Western Railway but from 2007 they were all either repainted into that company's livery or taken off lease and transferred to other operators.
 single-car units carried a black and gold livery to promote the Devon and Cornwall Rail Partnership, or (from 2005) a blue livery and coloured pictures promoting the named line:
 153302 Devon and Cornwall Rail Partnership
 153308 Devon and Cornwall Rail Partnership
 153329 St Ives Bay Line
 153369 The Looe Valley Explorer
 153374 Devon and Cornwall Rail Partnership
 153377 Devon and Cornwall Rail Partnership
 153380 Devon and Cornwall Rail Partnership
 153382 Devon and Cornwall Rail Partnership
  two-car units carried a maroon livery with coloured pictures promoting the relevant line:
 150233 Lady Margaret of Looe Valley
 150240 The Tamar Kingfisher
 150241 The Tarka Belle
 150253 The Exmouth Avocet
 150261 The Riviera Flyer
 150265 The Maritime Line

See also

 List of ACoRP members

References
 Department for Transport (2007), Introduction to Community Rail
 Devon and Cornwall Rail Partnership (1999), Great Scenic Railways of Devon & Cornwall
 Devon and Cornwall Rail Partnership (2002), Looe Valley Line Trails from the Track
 Devon and Cornwall Rail Partnership (2005), Working in Partnership in Devon and Cornwall
 Devon and Cornwall Rail Partnership (2005), Explore the Beauty of the Tamar Valley and The Looe Valley by Rail
 Devon and Cornwall Rail Partnership (2005), Tarka, Riviera & Avocet Line Guide
 Devon and Cornwall Rail Partnership (2007), Spotting Wild Birds by Train

External links
Devon & Cornwall Rail Partnership
Devon and Cornwall Rail Ale Trails
Great Scenic Railways in Devon and Cornwall

Rail transport in Cornwall
Rail transport in Devon
Community railway lines in England